The Bakutis Coast is that part of the coast of Marie Byrd Land, West Antarctica, extending from a point opposite eastern Dean Island, at , to Cape Herlacher, or between Hobbs Coast in the west and Walgreen Coast in the east. It stretches between 127°05'W and 114°12'W. The coast in this area is bounded by several large ice-covered islands and the very extensive Getz Ice Shelf. This coast was sighted by members of the US Antarctic Service, 1939–1941, and was charted in part from air photos taken by Operation Highjump, 1946–1947, both expeditions led by Admiral Richard E. Byrd. The United States Geological Survey completely mapped the coast from ground surveys and U.S. Navy air photos, 1959–1966.

Bakutis Coast was named by the Advisory Committee on Antarctic Names for Rear Admiral Fred E. Bakutis, Commander of the U.S. Naval Support Force, Antarctica, from 1965 to 1967.

The hinterland of Bakutis Coast is the location of Byrd Station, which is located in the interior, about 500 km from the actual coast.

See also
Hadley Point

References
 

 
Coasts of Antarctica
Landforms of Marie Byrd Land